Flecheiras is a fishing village on the northeastern coast of Ceará, Brazil. It has about 1200 permanent residents.

Location

Industry
The traditional industry in Flecheiras is fishing, but in recent years, tourism has gained importance. The village's beaches benefit from a lack of wind that is predominant in other local beach communities.

Fishing
Flecheiran fishermen go to sea in jangadas, small and simplistic sailboats. In the past, it was common for the fishermen to sail up to 200 kilometres, remaining asea for a week. Nowadays a mere 50 kilometres is travelled to get lobsters and camurupim.

Infrastructure
Flecheiras has a very good infrastructure compared to other coastal towns in Trairi.  There are three main entrances of the main highway from Guajiru to Trairi. One of them also has a gas station.
The square is quite big and lies just of the beach. On the beach there are many restaurants and at low tide one can enjoy the natural pools and the coral.

The community is served by the chapel of São Pedro.

Nature
Most of Flecheiras' natural vegetation is still intact. The village and surrounding are full with palmtrees, banana plants, cashew trees, castanholas, sugar canes, guajiru and mango trees. In the sand dunes behind the village there is hardly any plants at all. Cows and donkeys walk around freely and wind blows hard of the steep dunes.

Populated coastal places in Ceará
Populated places in Ceará